Biria may refer to:
 Biria people, an Australian Aboriginal group
 Biria language, a language of Australia
 Birya, a village in Israel
 Nasser Biria, Iranian cleric